Kridid is a small town and rural commune in Sidi Bennour Province of the Casablanca-Settat region of Morocco. At the time of the 2004 census, the commune had a total population of 12,751 people living in 2023 households.

References

Populated places in Sidi Bennour Province
Rural communes of Casablanca-Settat